Sigela eoides, the youthful sigela moth, is a species of moth in the family Erebidae. It was first described by William Barnes and James Halliday McDunnough in 1913 and it is found in North America.

The MONA or Hodges number for Sigela eoides is 8435.

References

Further reading

 
 
 

Scolecocampinae
Articles created by Qbugbot
Moths described in 1913